Of Mice & Men is the debut studio album by American rock band Of Mice & Men. It was originally planned to be released on February 23, 2010, but was delayed until March 9. The album was released through Rise Records and was produced by Joey Sturgis. This is the only album to feature bassist and backing vocalist Jaxin Hall.

Background
Of Mice & Men began progress on their self-titled debut shortly after demo session recordings. The group was signed to Rise within lead vocalist Austin Carlile's acknowledgment that the previous group he was a part of, Attack Attack!, were signed to label upon his membership. The album was officially announced by Austin Carlile on the band's YouTube channel on December 23, 2009, and is currently available on SmartPunk, MerchNOW, and InterPunk. Shortly after the album's release Carlile left the band and Jerry Roush took his position on unclean vocals. After Warped Tour 2010, Jaxin Hall left the band to improve his home life and work on his clothing company, Love Before Glory. Jerry was with Of Mice & Men up to the This Is a Family Tour with label mates Attack Attack!. After this, Carlile was invited and returned to the band again with Roush fired. Austin Carlile was working on a side project with Alan Ashby at the time, so when he was invited back, he said that he and Alan were a package deal. Alan was put on rhythm guitar and Shayley Bourget was moved to bass, but he was still doing clean vocals. Music videos were made for the songs "Those in Glass Houses" and "Second & Sebring".

Track listing
All lyrics written by Austin Carlile, Jaxin Hall, and Shayley Bourget; all music composed by Of Mice & Men.

Personnel 
Of Mice & Men
 Austin Carlile – unclean vocals
 Phil Manansala – lead guitar
 Shayley Bourget – clean vocals, rhythm guitar, piano on "Second & Sebring"
 Jaxin Hall – bass, backing vocals
 Valentino Arteaga – drums, percussion

Additional personnel
 Joey Sturgis – production, engineering, mixing, mastering

Charts

References

2010 debut albums
Rise Records albums
Of Mice & Men (band) albums
Albums produced by Joey Sturgis